Nóregs konungatal (List of Norwegian Kings) is an Icelandic skaldic poem. Composed around 1190, the poem is preserved in the 14th-century Flateyjarbók manuscript. It is based on the lost historical work of Sæmundr fróði and is the best extant testimony on the scope of Sæmundr's work. Consisting of 83 stanzas, the poem was composed for the influential Icelander Jón Loftsson and celebrates his descent from the Norwegian royal line. The poem is modelled after the earlier genealogical poems Háleygjatal and Ynglingatal, with which it shares the metre of kviðuháttr. It is thought to contain the central points of Sæmundr's lost work, especially its chronological information.

Notes

References

 
 
 Eysteinn Björnsson (2002). Index of Old Norse/Icelandic Skaldic Poetry. Published online at: https://web.archive.org/web/20060923215712/http://www.hi.is/~eybjorn/ugm/skindex/skindex.html See in particular Nóregs konungatal at https://web.archive.org/web/20070305085907/http://www.hi.is/~eybjorn/ugm/skindex/nktt.html from the editions of Finnur Jónsson and E. A. Kock.
 
 

Skaldic poems